Mount Cordonnier is located on the border of Alberta and British Columbia on the Continental Divide. It was named in 1918 after General Victor Louis Emilien Cordonnier.

See also
List of peaks on the Alberta–British Columbia border
List of mountains of Alberta
Mountains of British Columbia

References

Three-thousanders of Alberta
Three-thousanders of British Columbia
Canadian Rockies